is a railway station of the Chūō Main Line, East Japan Railway Company (JR East) in  Katsunuma-Hishiyama, in the city of Kōshū, Yamanashi Prefecture, Japan.

Lines
Katsunuma-budōkyō Station is served by the Chūō Main Line, and is 112.5 kilometers from the terminus of the line at Tokyo Station.

Station layout
The station consists of one island platform. The station is staffed.

Platforms

History 
The JGR became the JNR (Japanese National Railways) after the end of World War II. A new two-story station building was completed in October 1980. With the dissolution and privatization of the JNR on April 1, 1987, the station came under the control of the East Japan Railway Company. The station was named to its present name on April 1, 1993. Automated turnstiles using the Suica IC Card system came into operation from October 16, 2004.

Passenger statistics
In fiscal 2017, the station was used by an average of 450 passengers daily (boarding passengers only).

Surrounding area
former Enzan city hall

See also
 List of railway stations in Japan

References

 Miyoshi Kozo. Chuo-sen Machi to eki Hyaku-niju nen. JT Publishing (2009)

External links

JR East Katsunuma-budōkyō Station
 

Railway stations in Yamanashi Prefecture
Railway stations in Japan opened in 1913
Chūō Main Line
Stations of East Japan Railway Company
Kōshū, Yamanashi